Zoology is a 2016 Russian drama film directed by Ivan I. Tverdovsky (ru). It received generally positive reviews from critics.

Plot
Natasha lives alone with her mother in a small seaside town. Her life is boring and conventional. In the zoo where she works, Natasha has long been an object of ridicule. Suddenly, a strange metamorphosis occurs to her - for no apparent reason she grows a tail. She has to go through shame, hope, and despair to find herself.

Cast
Natalya Pavlenkova as Natasha
Masha Tokareva as Katya
Aleksandr Gorchilin as Stylist
Dmitriy Groshev as Peter
Olga Ergina as Secretary

Reception

Critical response
Zoology has an approval rating of 86% on review aggregator website Rotten Tomatoes, based on 29 reviews, and an average rating of 6.76/10.

Awards
51st Karlovy Vary International Film Festival – Special Jury Prize
Kinotavr – Best Actress (Natalia Pavlenkova)

References

External links

2016 drama films
Russian drama films
2010s Russian-language films